Raleigh Water Works and E.B. Bain Water Treatment Plant is a historic water works complex located at Raleigh, North Carolina. The original section was built in 1941, with additions made about 1946–1947, and in the 1960s.  The
complex includes the shell of the original one-story, brick pump house (1887 with 1923 alterations); the one-story, brick filter house (1887); and the Art Deco treatment plant (1939-1940) with adjacent settling basins. The main block of the treatment plant is a three-story, three-bay wide mass topped by a hipped, battened metal roof, with flanking stepped back two-story sections. Also on the property are three storage reservoirs for treated water, dating from 1887, 1940 and the 1950s.

It was listed on the National Register of Historic Places in 1999.

References 

Industrial buildings and structures on the National Register of Historic Places in North Carolina
Art Deco architecture in North Carolina
Industrial buildings completed in 1887
Buildings and structures in Raleigh, North Carolina
National Register of Historic Places in Raleigh, North Carolina